Cascapédia may refer to:

 Cascapédia River, a river in the Gaspé Peninsula of Quebec, Canada
 Cascapédia–Saint-Jules, a municipality in Quebec, Canada
 Lake Cascapedia, a lake in Quebec, Canada
 Cascapédia Bay, an arm of the Gulf of Saint Lawrence located between Quebec and New Brunswick
 Cascapedia, a U.S. National Champion racemare